Americans in Cuba consist of expatriates and immigrants from the United States as well as Cubans of American descent. As of September 1998, there are about 2,000 to 3,000 Americans living in Cuba.

Migration history
Following the Cuban Revolution, small numbers of Americans, mostly communists, began migrating to Cuba. In the 1980s, there was an organized group of Americans who called themselves the Union of North American Residents. They consist of nearly 30 expatriates, some members of the US Communist Party while others are leftist writers or English teachers.

Many American fugitives have taken refuge in Cuba. Some of them remain on the FBI's Most Wanted List, and most were members of radical leftist organizations, Puerto Rican separatist groups and Black nationalist organizations (most notably the Black Panther Party) who fled to the country to escape U.S. authorities in the 1960s and 1970s. In 1968, more than 30 planes were hijacked or attempted to be hijacked to Cuba.

Notable people
 Nehanda Abiodun - American, Black revolutionary activist, accused serial robber and accomplice of Assata Shakur
 Philip Agee - former CIA case officer and writer
 William Lee Brent - Black Panther Party member, robber, and aircraft hijacker
 Lorna Burdsall - American dancer and choreographer and wife of Cuban intelligence official Manuel Piñeiro
Victor Manuel Gerena - allegedly hiding in Cuba after stealing $7,000,000 in Hartford, Connecticut; remains at-large on the FBI's 10 Most Wanted List
 Ernest Hemingway - famous American author who purchased a home outside of Havana in 1940 and lived there with his wife for 20 years
 William Alexander Morgan - US citizen who fought in the Cuban Revolution
 Assata Shakur - Escaped convict who committed first-degree murder of a policeman
 Robert F. Williams - Civil Rights activist who fled to avoid prosecution by the FBI. Also established a pro-Civil Rights radio station, Radio Free Dixie
 Robert Vesco - fugitive United States financier

See also
 Cuba–United States relations
 Cuban American

References

Cuba
 
 
Americans
Cuba–United States relations